An oxygen breathing apparatus (OBA) is a rebreather. It is used primarily in firefighting. Its oxygen is generated by chemicals contained in the green canister, which is inserted at the base of the breathing device.
 The canister uses potassium superoxide as both a CO2 scrubber and an O2 generator. A sodium chlorate candle in the base generates additional oxygen when first beginning use as the canister has to achieve a high internal temperature before it will start generating oxygen on its own. It is the circulation of exhaled air through the canister that starts the chemical process, usually taking less than five minutes, the normal burn time of the "candle" and the mask will initially fill with a light, harmless smoke. The extreme heat of the chemical reaction requires the use of thick leather gloves for handling spent canisters.  The bags along either side of the chest unit cool the air mixture before inhalation and is a surprisingly effective system, with the air being quite cool when entering the face mask. There is a 60-minute timer at the top of the chest unit which, during the fighting of a casualty, is set for only 45 minutes.  This would give the user a 15-minute window to evacuate to a safe atmosphere. Though it looks bulky and unwieldy it is a light and comfortable device to wear and does not much interfere with the user's freedom of movement. 

As of early 2001, the US Navy has been replacing the OBA for firefighting with the SCBA. The SCBA is more cost-effective than the OBA, and also does not produce hazardous waste, a problem with the chemical oxygen generation system.

References

Equipment of the United States Navy
Rebreathers
Industrial breathing sets